Coitsville Center is an unincorporated community in Mahoning County, in the U.S. state of Ohio.

History
A variant name was Coitsville. A post office called Coitsville was established in 1826, and remained in operation until 1900. The community was named for its location near the geographical center of Coitsville Township.

References

Unincorporated communities in Mahoning County, Ohio
1826 establishments in Ohio
Populated places established in 1826
Unincorporated communities in Ohio